Hon. Richard Oliver Stanley (29 January 1920 – 15 November 1983) was a British Conservative Party Member of Parliament.

Early life
Stanley attended Ludgrove School.

Political career
Stanley represented North Fylde from 1950 until he stood down at the 1966 general election. He was from a powerful family, and was related to several Victorian Prime Ministers (Derby, Salisbury, Rosebery, and Balfour) and various other statesmen (the 15th, 16th, and 17th Earls of Derby, Clarendon, Hartington and Oliver Stanley). His father, Lord Stanley, had represented Fylde from 1922 to 1938. His successor was Sir Walter Clegg.

Personal
Stanley was married twice, first from 1965 to 1976 (her death) to Susan Aubrey-Fletcher, daughter of Sir John Aubrey-Fletcher, 7th Baronet. He was married secondly after 1976 to Mary Tylor. He died childless.

References

1920 births
1983 deaths
Conservative Party (UK) MPs for English constituencies
UK MPs 1950–1951
UK MPs 1951–1955
UK MPs 1955–1959
UK MPs 1959–1964
UK MPs 1964–1966
Younger sons of barons
Richard
People educated at Ludgrove School